Semjbaataryn Baatarsüren (born 10 November 1975) is a Mongolian international footballer. He made his first appearance for the Mongolia national football team in 2000.

References

1975 births
Mongolian footballers
Mongolia international footballers
Khoromkhon players
Living people

Association football midfielders